Saara Orav (born 30 December 2001) is an inactive Estonian tennis player.

She currently attends Rice University. She is at Baker college pursuing a B.S. degree of mechanical engineering. 

Playing for Estonia Fed Cup team, Orav has a win–loss record of 3–4.

She has been playing only two matches (first-round losses) on the ITF Circuit since February 2020.

ITF Circuit finals

Doubles: 3 (1 title, 2 runner-ups)

Fed Cup participation
Orav made her Fed Cup debut for Estonia in 2018, while the team was competing in the Europe/Africa Zone Group I.

Singles (1–1)

Doubles (2–3)

Junior career
Orav has a career-high ITF juniors ranking of 248, achieved on 28 October 2019.

ITF Junior finals

Singles (2–2)

Doubles (3–2)

References

External links
 
 
 
 

2001 births
Living people
Sportspeople from Viljandi
Estonian female tennis players
21st-century Estonian women